Dave Borgonzi (born November 19, 1982) is an American football coach who is the linebackers coach for the Chicago Bears of the National Football League (NFL). He previously served as an assistant coach for the Indianapolis Colts, Tampa Bay Buccaneers and Dallas Cowboys.

Playing career 
Borgonzi played inside linebacker at Amherst College. There he served as a three year starter and was named a team captain during his senior season.

Coaching career

Syracuse
Borgonzi spent two years at Syracuse working as a graduate assistant. While with the Orange he earned his master's degree in education.

Harvard
While at Harvard, Borgonzi served as a recruiter for the school and as the assistant defensive secondary coach.

Dallas
Borgonzi worked from 2011 to 2013 as a coaching assistant for the Dallas Cowboys. He worked with the defensive side of the ball for his first two years before moving to offense in 2013.

Tampa Bay
From 2014 to 2017 Borgonzi worked as an assistant for the Buccaneers.

Colts
Dave was hired as the Colts linebackers coach in 2018. He missed week 15 of the 2020 season due to COVID-19.

Bears
On February 2, 2022, Borgonzi was hired by the Chicago Bears as their linebackers coach, following new Head Coach Matt Eberflus from the Indianapolis Colts.

Personal life 
Borgonzi's brother, Mike, serves as the director of football operations for the Kansas City Chiefs.

Borgonzi and his wife Alyssa have a daughter, Gianna, and a son, James.

References

Living people
Year of birth missing (living people)
American football linebackers
Indianapolis Colts coaches
Tampa Bay Buccaneers coaches
Harvard Crimson football coaches
Dallas Cowboys coaches
Syracuse Orange football coaches
Coaches of American football from Massachusetts
People from Everett, Massachusetts
Chicago Bears coaches